Gleb Zherdev (born 18 May 2000) is a Belarusian professional footballer who plays for Bnei Yehuda.

References

External links 
 
 

2000 births
Living people
Belarusian footballers
Association football midfielders
FC Minsk players
FC Naftan Novopolotsk players
FC Slavia Mozyr players
Bnei Yehuda Tel Aviv F.C. players
Belarusian expatriate footballers
Expatriate footballers in Israel
Belarusian expatriate sportspeople in Israel